Marseille XIII was a French rugby league club from the city of Marseille.

History
Marseille XIII were founded in 1946. The club has only won the French Championship once, in 1949. They have however lost three finals, in 1950, 1952 and 1973. Despite their poor record in the French Championship, they have had more success in the Lord Derby Cup, appearing in the final seven times and winning on five occasions.

They moved up to the Elite Division of the French Championship for the 2005-2006. The following season Marseille XIII were declared bankrupt and wound up.
A new club, Marseille XIII Avenir, was founded from the ashes in 2007.

Honours
 French Championship: 1949
 Lord Derby Cup: 1947-48, 1948–49, 1956–57, 1964–65, 1970-71 (5 times)

 

French rugby league teams
Sport in Marseille
1946 establishments in France
2006 disestablishments in France
Rugby clubs established in 1946
Defunct rugby league teams in France